Koumanis (also Κούμανι - Koumani) is a mountain village and a community in the municipal unit of Foloi, Elis, Greece. Its population in 2011 was 498 for the village and 506 for the community, which includes the small villages Ai Giannakis and Kastania. Koumanis is located at 650 m above sea level, at the northern edge of the Foloi oak forest. The small rivers Gkoura and Koumaneiko form deep ravines near Koumanis. Its climate is cool during the summer and wet during the winter. Koumanis is 3 km east of the village Foloi, 3 km southeast of Antroni, 9 km southwest of Lampeia and 20 km northeast of Olympia. The inhabitants of Koumanis and the neighbouring village Antroni were known for their bravery during the Greek War of Independence.

Population

See also

List of settlements in Elis

References

External links

The Koumani Homepage 
 Koumanis GTP Travel Pages

Populated places in Elis